The Savings Bank of South Australia was a bank founded in the colony of South Australia in 1848, based in Adelaide. In the early 20th century it established a presence in schools by setting up a special category of savings accounts for schoolchildren, and grew through the following decades.

In 1984 it merged with the State Bank of South Australia, with the merged entity taking the latter name.

Foundation and early days

The Savings Bank of South Australia opened on 11 March 1848 with a single employee, John Hector, trading from a room in Adelaide's Gawler Place. The room was provided rent-free by the Glen Osmond Mining Company. On that day it took its first deposit, of £29, from an illiterate "Afghan" shepherd whose name was recorded as Croppo Sing (probably "Singh", the Sikh masculine surname). Other deposits soon followed. A month later, the fledgling bank made its first loan, of £500, to John Colton. Colton became a successful businessman and later politician, and in 1875 was appointed to the bank's board of trustees.

The bank was based on the savings bank movement first advocated by the Scotsman Rev. Henry Duncan. Prior to the advent of the savings bank movement, commercial banks were not interested in taking small deposits from working-class men, as the bookwork involved was more expensive than any potential benefit to the bank. Duncan believed that great benefit to society would result from encouraging the working class to deposit their savings in a bank and teaching the working class the important virtues of thrift.

1907: Penny Bank Department
In 1907 the Savings Bank of South Australia established the Penny Bank Department to take deposits as little as one penny from school children. These school savings account quickly became popular and almost every public and private school in the state was permitted to take deposits from children on behalf of the bank. School banking was instrumental in instilling the savings mentality in children and helped to make the bank the largest in South Australia, now a state.

1938–1965: growth and development

During the 26-year era of Liberal premier Sir Thomas Playford (November 1938 – March 1965), the bank was a key tool of his vision for the state's rapid economic and industrial development. Playford used both the Savings Bank and the State Bank to finance ETSA and the Housing Trust.

The two state-owned banks complemented each other. The Savings Bank was for the people to deposit their savings and for others to borrow money for mortgages on fair terms, while the State Bank was used for larger projects. During this period the bank took on many new customers, especially migrants brought out to South Australia under assisted migration schemes.

Head office building
The architects Eric McMichael and Alfred Charles Harris, in their practice E.H. McMichael and Harris, designed the new Savings Bank building at 97 King William Stret in 1938. However, owing to shortages of both labour and materials during World War II, it took five years to be completed. It was their largest-ever commission, and at the time became the city's tallest building. McMichael was responsible for the design, after trustees and executives of the bank had visited Sydney and Melbourne to inspect the most modern buildings in those cities. The style is mainly Art Deco, with some Classical elements. Significant to the Art Deco style are the motifs depicting South Australian agriculture, along with the use of parallel lines, the polished granite base and the monumental entrance. The building was listed on the South Australian Heritage Register on 11 September 1986.

1970s–1984: lead-up to the merger
Labor premier Don Dunstan (June 1970 – February 1979) first floated the idea of merging the State Bank and the Savings Bank, but the conservative trustees of the bank were strongly opposed to this idea and highly suspicious of the Labor Party. Early in his premiership, Dunstan had got the trustees offside by deceiving them by stating he intended to pass some minor annual leave changes through the Parliament, while actually changing the formation of the board and allowing the Labor Government to appoint the chairman of the Savings Bank and allowing trustees to sit on both boards. This had effect of giving control of the banks to Labor Party and not the trustees, who had ably served both of the banks for many decades. Dunstan also had raided both of the banks of their reserve funds to pay for his health, education and arts schemes.

After Dunstan had changed the composition of the banks boards, they requested a merger. However, Labor lost the 1979 election and Liberal premier David Tonkin (September 1979 – November 1982) would not allow the banks to merge.

Under the Labor premier John Bannon (November 1982 – September 1992), the two banks were merged in 1984.

State Bank of South Australia

The combined bank, called the State Bank of South Australia, had rapid growth in the economic boom of the 1980s. However at the end of the boom came a bust, and the State Bank of SA (like the State Bank of Victoria) was unable to withstand the early 1990s recession in Australia. The State Bank of SA failed because it had a "non-performing" loan portfolio, meaning that repayments were not made on money lent. It later became BankSA.

See also

There are a number of building societies and banks with intertwining histories. These include:
St.George Bank
St.George Co-operative Building Society Ltd. / St.George Building Society 
Cronulla & District Co-operative Building Society
St.George and Cronulla Building Society
Advance Bank
NSW Permanent Building & Investment Society / NSW Permanent Building Society
BankSA / Bank of South Australia
Savings Bank of South Australia
State Bank of South Australia
Westpac Banking Corporation
Too many to mention - those of major relevance to St.George / Advance Bank / BankSA:
RESI Statewide Building Society
Bank of Melbourne (1989)
Bank of Melbourne (2011)

References

External links
 BankSA history

Banks of Australia
Banks established in 1848
Companies based in Adelaide
Australian companies established in 1848